Ariyakudi Ramanuja Iyengar (19 May 1890 – 23 January 1967), popularly known as Ariyakudi, was a Carnatic music vocalist, born in Ariyakudi, a town in the present-day Sivaganga district of Tamil Nadu. Ariyakudi developed a unique style of singing which came to be known as The Ariyakudi Tradition and is followed by his students. He is credited with establishing the modern katcheri (concert) traditions in Carnatic music.

In 1954, he was awarded the Sangeet Natak Akademi Fellowship, the highest honour conferred by Sangeet Natak Akademi, India's National Academy for Music, Dance and Drama. This was followed by Padma Bhushan by Government of India in 1958.

Early life and background
Ariyakudi was born in Ariyakudi, a town in the Karaikudi district, present-day Sivaganga district of Tamil Nadu, South India, on 19 May 1890. He studied under Pudukottai Malayappa Iyer and Namakkal Narasimha Iyengar in his early years. Later he studied for several years under Poochi Srinivasa Iyengar, the senior most disciple of Patnam Subramania Iyer.

He married Ponnammal (in 1909) and the couple had two daughters. Later he set up another house with Kanjanur Sundarambal Dhanammal, who was a devadasi and became his student after which there was a romantic association. With two women in his life, his later years witnessed domestic acrimony.

Career and legacy
He made his debut at Tyagaraja Aradhana in 1918.

The doyen of Carnatic music, Semmangudi Srinivasa Iyer, is known to have remarked, "I was greatly influenced by Ariyakudi Ramanuja Iyengar. I do not want another life. But if there is one, I want to be able to sing like Ramanuja Iyengar". And another maestro, G N Balasubramaniam, a contemporary of Ariyakudi, is known to have prostrated in front of him out of respect. Ariyakudi formed a formidable partnership on the concert platform with mridangam maestro Palghat Mani Iyer and two had a strong friendship born out of mutual respect. Palghat Mani Iyer is reported to have said, "Annaa (Chembai Vaidyanatha Bhagavatar) and Iyengarval (Ariyakudi) are like my two eyes".

Disciples
Ariyakudi's famous disciples include [V V Sadagopan]K V Narayanaswamy, B. Rajam Iyer, Alepey Venkatesan, Madurai N. Krishnan, and Ambi Bhagavathar. He also had regular interactions with M.S. Subbulakshmi and shaped her musical interests.

Awards
 Sangeetha Kalanidhi award  (1938) 
 Sangeet Natak Akademi Award (1952) 
  Sangeet Natak Akademi Fellowship (1954) 
 Isai Perarignar (1950) by Tamil Isai Sangam, Chennai
 Gayaka Shikhamani by Mysore darbar
 Sangita Ratnakara by Vellore Sangeetha Sabha
 Sangita Kala Shikhamani by Indian Fine Arts Society, Chennai
 Padma Bhushan award by Government of India in 1958

Bibliography

See also

References

External links
 
Ariyakudi Ramanuja Iyengar Home Page

An Article Written by Ariyakudi Ramanuja Iyengar in Ananda Vikatan in 1939 (Tamil)

1890 births
1967 deaths
Male Carnatic singers
Carnatic singers
Sangeetha Kalanidhi recipients
Recipients of the Sangeet Natak Akademi Award
Recipients of the Padma Bhushan in arts
People from Sivaganga district
Recipients of the Sangeet Natak Akademi Fellowship
20th-century Indian male classical singers
Singers from Tamil Nadu